Rába 38M Botond was a Hungarian all-terrain truck. Designed by Győr-based Rába Magyar Vagon- és Gépgyár works, it was extensively used by the Royal Hungarian Army during World War II. The truck was based on a successful Raba AFi truck chassis, but was built in a relatively rare configuration of 6x4. This 1.5 ton lorry was used to ferry both cargo and personnel. There is only one surviving truck, currently in the Transport Museum of Budapest.

Design and development 

Development of the new vehicle for the Royal Hungarian Army started in 1937, when Dezső Winkler was ordered by the Ministry of Defence to create a project of a 1.5-ton lorry to be used as personnel carrier. In order to have the ability for higher cross-country mobility but also keep the costs down, the truck received the 6x4 configuration. To aid in difficult terrain, the construction received a number of innovative mechanisms. One was the second axle, raised above the ground level and in contact only at the peak of a summit. Another innovation was a set of two rollers mounted at the front bumper that were intended to aid in crossing of ditches. The latter feature was a copy of a similar mechanism used in the 31M H-2 lorry designed by Zsigmond Hollós of the Manfred Weiss Steel and Metal Works (HMW). Two prototypes were built and were well received by the Ministry of Defence. The initial configuration allowed for 14 people to be transported in an open cargo compartment and the cab. The lorry was designed to be able to tow up to 2000 kilograms in a trailer, it was also equipped with a factory-installed winch.

Production and variants 

As no factory in Hungary could cope with such a massive government order, the 38M Botond was built by a consortium of six companies, with HMW and Mavag as the main contractors and Láng, Ganz Works and HSCS works producing various parts.

Between 1938 and 1941 the consortium built 1443 38M Botond trucks. When Hungary joined World War II, a new version (dubbed 38M Botond B) entered serial production. Only minor changes to the design were introduced: some steel parts were replaced with cheaper and easier to obtain materials, the engine power was increased from 70 to 72 Horsepower. The ministry ordered 1400 more vehicles in 1942 and an additional order for 657 vehicles followed in 1943 (all Botond B variant). However, some completed and half-completed lorries were destroyed by Allied bombers during bombing raids on MW works and MAVAG.

As the design proved adequate, it was often field-converted to various roles, including radio cars, command vehicles, artillery trailers and tank tows. Although some of the factories were destroyed, the production continued well into 1944, with 882 out of 2098 trucks ordered for that year delivered to the armed forces. After the Soviet take-over of Hungary several trucks were completed out of spare parts and delivered to the Ministry of Defence in 1948.

In 1943 an upgraded version, the 38M Botond C was designed. It featured a 100 HP six-cylinder engine. However, the sole prototype was destroyed in an Allied air raid. After the war the works on the C version briefly resumed, but were abandoned as a D-350 Steyr truck license-built by Csepel was found to be a much superior design. The remaining pieces were gradually withdrawn from military units in favour of the D-350.

References

Citations

Bibliography

External links

Military vehicles of Hungary
World War II vehicles
Military trucks
Armoured fighting vehicles of Hungary